The 1993 Avon County Council election took place on 6 May 1993 to elect members of Avon County Council in England. This was on the same day as other nationwide local elections. The Liberal Democrats made a number of gains, mainly at the expense of the Conservatives. Labour remained the largest group on the council, but were 6 seats short of gaining a majority.

This was the last election for Avon County, which was abolished in 1996 and replaced with four new unitary authorities: Bath and North East Somerset, Bristol, North Somerset and South Gloucestershire.

Electoral division results
The electoral division results listed below are based on the changes from the 1989 elections, not taking into account any party defections or by-elections. Sitting councillors are marked with an asterisk (*).

Ashley

Avonmouth

Bath Central

Bath North East

Bath North West

Bath South

Bath South East

Bath South West

Bath West

Bathavon

Bedminster

Bishopston

Bishopsworth

Bitton

Brislington East

Brislington West

Cabot

Chew Valley

Clevedon

Clifton

Cotham

Downend

Easton

Eastville

Filton

Filwood

Frome Vale

Gordano Valley

Hartcliffe

Henbury

Hengrove

Henleaze

Hillfields

Horfield

Keynsham East

Keynsham West

Kings Chase

Kingsweston

Knowle

Ladden Brook

Lawrence Hill

Lockleaze

Longwell Green

Midsomer Norton

Mount Hill

Nailsea

Patchway

Portishead

Priory

Radstock

Redland

Rodway

Severn Vale

Siston

Sodbury

Southmead

Southville

St George East

St George West

Stockwood

Stoke Bishop

The Combe

Thornbury

Westbury-on-Trym

Weston East

Weston North

Weston South

Weston West

Whitchurch Park

Wick

Windmill Hill

Winscombe & Wrington Vale

Winterbourne

Worle

Yate

Yatton & Yeo Moor

References 

1993 English local elections
1993
1990s in Bristol
1990s in Gloucestershire
1990s in Somerset